Vicki Lewis is an American singer and actress of film, stage, and television. She is best known for her role as Beth in the NBC sitcom NewsRadio.

Personal life
Lewis was born and raised in Cincinnati, Ohio, the daughter of Marlene, a nursing administrator, and Jim Lewis, an air traffic supervisor. She has a sister, Denise.  

After graduating from Anderson High School in Cincinnati in 1978, she studied musical theater at the University of Cincinnati – College-Conservatory of Music. After receiving her diploma she moved to New York City. She proceeded to work in various on and off-Broadway shows. 

Lewis was in a long-term relationship with Nick Nolte. The two met during the filming of I'll Do Anything. She is married to sound designer Philip G. Allen.

Career

Lewis's film appearances include roles in Finding Nemo, Finding Dory, Mouse Hunt, Godzilla, Pushing Tin, 2007's California Dreaming with NewsRadio co-star Dave Foley, and 2010's Den Brother. On television, Lewis starred for 5 seasons on the NBC sitcom NewsRadio, followed by Three Sisters and the WB animated comedy Mission Hill. 

She made guest appearances on Seinfeld (in the episodes "The Secretary" and "The Race") and Murphy Brown. In a recurring role on Home Improvement, she played Maureen Binford, producer of the show-within-a-show Tool Time. On How I Met Your Mother, she had the recurring role of Lily Aldrin's doctor, "Dr. Sonya".

She appeared on Caroline in the City, The Norm Show, Grace Under Fire, Phenom and The 5 Mrs. Buchanans. More recently, she made guest appearances on Surviving Suburbia, ABC's Grey's Anatomy, Disney Channel's Sonny with a Chance as Ms. Bitterman, the social worker on The Middle, and FX's Dirt. She recurred as Erica on Modern Family, as Mrs. Chadwick in Making History, and Dr. Chapman in Still The King, Miss Moffett in [[Angie Tribeca and Marie Mortel in The Blacklist.

Aside from Mission Hill, her voice acting career includes characters in Justice League Heroes, Rugrats Pre-School Daze, King of the Hill, Hercules: The Animated Series, An Extremely Goofy Movie, Finding Nemo, Phineas and Ferb, and Justice League: The New Frontier. Most recently, she voiced Eve in the 2010 film Alpha and Omega and its sequel.

On stage, Lewis has appeared in City of Angels and My One and Only in Los Angeles, and has performed as a soloist with the New York Pops at Carnegie Hall. Her Broadway credits include I Can Get It For You Wholesale, Do Black Patent Leather Shoes Really Reflect Up?, Snoopy!!! The Musical, Damn Yankees, Chicago, The Crucible, and she was the final actress to play Countess Lily in Anastasia. She also appeared with Peter Gallagher and Patti LuPone in Pal Joey at the New York City Center. Lewis won the 2007 Ovation Award for Best Featured Actress in a Musical for the world premiere of Michael John LaChiusa's Hotel C'est L'amour.

She was part of the one-night celebrity-performed staging of Howard Ashman's unproduced musical Dreamstuff. The musical was re-imagined by Ashman's partners Marsha Malamet and Dennis Green and performed one night only at Los Angeles's Hayworth Theatre as part of the Bruno Kirby celebrity reading series. 

Her debut solo album East of Midnight was released in May 2010.  The eclectic rock album has songs penned by Lewis as well as three cover songs. Lewis considered the writing to be "dauntingly destructive and spiritually bereft. Locked in my office in Malibu, California I wrote what would become a self-fulfilling prophecy – it would also prove to be the making of me." 

In 2018, she starred on Broadway as Countess Lili in Anastasia, directed by Darko Tresnik. She played Ms. Winx/Mrs. Brown/Kyrie/Jessamyn Jacobs/Lady in Waiting in Between the Lines Off-Broadway in 2022.

Filmography

Film

Television

Video games

References

External links

Living people
20th-century American actresses
21st-century American actresses
Actresses from Cincinnati
American film actresses
American musical theatre actresses
American television actresses
American video game actresses
American voice actresses
American women singers
University of Cincinnati – College-Conservatory of Music alumni
Year of birth missing (living people)